WDNE-FM is a Country formatted broadcast radio station licensed to Elkins, West Virginia, serving North Central West Virginia.  WDNE-FM is owned and operated by West Virginia Radio Corporation.

References

External links
 98-9 WDNE Online
 

1985 establishments in West Virginia
DNE-FM
Radio stations established in 1985
DNE-FM